John Edward Buddenberg Jr. (born October 9, 1965) is a former American and Canadian football offensive lineman who played 2 seasons in the Canadian Football League. From 1989 to 1992 he was on NFL practice squad rosters and from 1991 to 1992 he was a player in WLAF.

Early life and education
John Buddenberg was born on October 9, 1965 in Wheeling, West Virginia. He went to high school at Bellaire High School and to college at Akron.

Professional career

NFL
Buddenberg was drafted in the 10th round (274th overall) of the 1989 NFL Draft by the Cleveland Browns. He spent time on the practice squads of the Cleveland Browns (1989), Minnesota Vikings (1989), Pittsburgh Steelers (1990), and the Atlanta Falcons (1991-1992) but he did not play in a single game.

WLAF
In the offseasons of 1991 and 1992, he played in the WLAF for the Sacramento Surge. He was named All-WLAF in 1992.

CFL
From 1993 to 1994, Buddenberg played for the Sacramento Gold Miners/San Antonio Texans of the Canadian Football League. He played in 35 games for them.

References

1965 births
Living people
Sacramento Gold Miners players
American football offensive linemen
Akron Zips football players